The 1995 Humboldt State Lumberjacks football team represented Humboldt State University during the 1995 NCAA Division II football season. Humboldt State competed in the Northern California Athletic Conference in 1995.

The 1995 Lumberjacks were led by fifth-year head coach Fred Whitmire. They played home games at the Redwood Bowl in Arcata, California. Humboldt State finished the season with a record of eight wins, one loss and one tie (8–1–1, 4–0 NCAC). The Lumberjacks outscored their opponents 348–181 for the season.

Schedule

Notes

References

Humboldt State
Humboldt State Lumberjacks football seasons
Northern California Athletic Conference football champion seasons
Humboldt State Lumberjacks football